Faces is the fifth studio album by American country music artist John Berry. It was released in 1996 by Capitol Nashville. It peaked at #9 on the Top Country Albums chart, and was certified Gold by the Recording Industry Association of America. The album's singles "Change My Mind," "She's Taken a Shine" and "I Will, If You Will" all reached Top 20 on the Hot Country Songs charts.

Track listing

Personnel

Musicians 
Eddie Bayers - drums
Barry Beckett – Wurlitzer electric piano
John Berry - lead vocals
Bruce Bouton – steel guitar
Dan Dugmore – steel guitar
Larry Franklin – fiddle
Sonny Garrish - steel guitar
John Hobbs – keyboards
Dann Huff – electric guitar
Billy Kirsch – piano
Terry McMillan – percussion
Brent Mason – electric guitar
Steve Nathan – keyboards
Michael Rhodes – bass guitar
Brent Rowan – electric guitar
Billy Joe Walker, Jr. – acoustic guitar

Background vocals
Michael Black – tracks 1, 2, 4, 5, 7-9
Gary Burr – track 4
Greg Gordon – tracks 2, 9
Chuck Jones – track 5
Mary Ann Kennedy – tracks 1, 2, 4-9
Patty Loveless – track 3
Delbert McClinton – track 6
Gary Nicholson – track 9
Pam Rose – track 5
Darrell Scott – tracks 1, 2, 4, 5, 7, 9
Dennis Wilson – tracks 2, 9

String section
Conni Ellisor, Carl Gorodetzky, David Davidson, Pamela Sixfin, Alan Umstead, David Angell, Cate Myer, Lee Larrison, Randall Olson, Antoine Silverman – violins
Kris Wilkinson, Jim Grosjean, Monisa Angell – violas
Bob Mason, Carol Rabinowitz – cellos

Strings conducted and arranged by David Campbell on "I Give My Heart;" conducted and arranged by Conni Ellisor for "Change My Mind" and "I Will If You Will". Carl Gorodetzky, concert master.

Chart performance

References

[ Faces] at Allmusic

1996 albums
John Berry (country singer) albums
Capitol Records albums